The catch-all term adult comics typically denotes comic books, comic magazines, comic strips or graphic novels that are marketed either mainly or strictly towards adult (or mature) readers. This can be because they contain material that could be considered thematically inappropriate for children, including vulgarity, morally questionable actions, disturbing imagery, and sexually explicit material.

Adult comics can be defined as intended for audience of 16 years or older.

In English-speaking countries

Early days 
Roger Sabin traces the history of adult comics back to the political cartoons published in broadsheets since the 19th century. In the 1930s, there were clandestinely produced tijuana bibles – rectangular, eight page pamphlets with black printing on cheap white paper. The artwork ranged from excellent to utterly crude and the stories were explicit sexual escapades, usually featuring well known cartoon characters, political figures, or movie stars, without the subjects' consent.

Sold under the counter in places such as tobacco stores and burlesque houses, millions of Tijuana Bibles were sold at the height of their popularity in the 1930s. They went into a steep decline after World War II and by the mid-1950s only a small trickle of new product was still appearing on the market, mainly in the form of cheaply printed, poorly drawn and tasteless little eight pagers which sold for 10 cents each in run-down candy stores and gas stations, circulating mainly among delinquent teenagers.

Starting in 1932, Norman Pett drew a strip called Jane for the British Daily Mirror newspaper.  The heroine would often find herself in awkward situations where she would lose her clothing for one reason or another.  The strip was written to some extent for a military audience to boost the morale of troops away from home.  Winston Churchill said that Jane was Britain's "secret weapon".

In the United States, pulp magazines such as Harry Donenfeld's Spicy Detective featured comics on heroines who lose their clothing, such as Adolphe Barreaux's Sally the Sleuth which debuted in 1934.  Many of the early comic publishers got their start in the pulps with Donenfeld for instance going on to found DC Comics.  Fiction House similarly started as a pulp magazine publisher, but in 1938, released Jumbo Comics featuring Sheena, Queen of the Jungle, the first of many scantily clad jungle girls.  Fiction House comics routinely featured attractive women on the covers, a trend which later became referred to as 'good girl art.'  In 1941, Quality Comics put out Police Comics featuring Phantom Lady, a scantily clad crime fighter.  Fox Feature Syndicate eventually began publishing Phantom Lady where she was drawn by Matt Baker, one of the most famous 'good girl' artists.  Milton Caniff started producing the comic strip Male Call in 1943, and Bill Ward came out with Torchy in 1944 featuring sexy heroines.

Pulp magazines were also known for their violence.  The Shadow carried two guns for killing criminals, and Batman also wielded a gun from 1939 through 1944 before giving it up.  Crime and horror comics were popular genres in the late 1940s and early 1950s with such titles as Lev Gleason Publications' Crime Does Not Pay, EC Comics' Crime Suspenstories, Crypt of Terror, Tales From the Crypt and Vault of Horror all enjoying brief spells of interest.  It is believed that EC had one of the best-selling lines at the time.  Harvey Kurtzman was one of the key writers for EC, and artists such as Wally Wood or Al Williamson began to do research for each new story far beyond what had been seen in titles published up to that time.

In the 1950s Irving Klaw published a line of underground fetish and bondage comics by artists like Eric Stanton, John Willie, and Gene Bilbrew. These never achieved widespread popularity but were kept in print for many years, sold through Klaw's mail order catalog to the same customers who bought his bondage photographs of Bettie Page. Not quite obscene enough to warrant prosecution, they skirted the limits of legality by avoiding full frontal nudity in their depictions.

The Comics Code Authority 
In 1954, a psychologist Dr. Fredric Wertham came out with a book Seduction of the Innocent that claimed that the rise in juvenile delinquency being reported in the news at the time was fueled by comic books.  He claimed that Batman and Robin were encouraging homosexuality, and decried the bondage seen in Wonder Woman's comic book.  EC Comics came under criticism for the graphic violence and gore seen in its crime and horror books.  EC publisher William Gaines was called before a Senate committee to testify, but he remained defensive saying that he was already censoring the more extreme things from his books.  Partly in order to avoid the government imposing a solution, the other major publishers banded together to form the Comics Code Authority which would screen comics before they went to press, and only allow the Code mark to appear if the comic passed their standards.

The Code was alarmingly strict.  It barred publishers from using the words 'crime,' 'horror' or 'terror' in their titles, thus forcing EC to abandon some of their most popular titles.  Police officers could not be portrayed in a negative light, and if a villain committed murder, he would have to be caught and punished by the end of the story.  No mention was allowed of vampires, werewolves or zombies, another swipe at EC.  Years later when Marvel introduced zombies into their books, they had to call them 'zuvembies' in order to pass the Code.  In general, DC and Marvel were supportive of the Code, but EC struggled to cope with the new rules, and eventually abandoned most of their titles to focus on Mad Magazine, which did not need Code approval.

The code also contained provisions against suggestive or salacious illustration, and required that females be drawn realistically without undue exposure.  This was a knock at Fiction House's good girl art covers, and may have contributed to Fiction House's closure.

Magazines and comic strips 
North American comic books tend to be around 7 by 10 inches in size. Magazines vary, but are usually larger.  Comic books tended to have a Comic Code label marking them as suitable for children, while magazines had no such requirement. This led to magazines becoming one of the most common formats for adult comics.

Playboy magazine first came out in 1953. It would feature single panel cartoons by artists such as Alberto Vargas, Archie Comics artist Dan DeCarlo, Plastic Man creator Jack Cole, LeRoy Neiman and later Olivia De Berardinis and Dean Yeagle.

In the mid-1960s, Playboy magazine started including a multipage strip called Little Annie Fanny by EC alumni Harvey Kurtzman and Will Elder with an occasional assist from artist Frank Frazetta. Annie had trouble keeping her clothes on, a trend seen also in the strips The Adventures of Phoebe Zeit-Geist, Wallace Wood's Sally Forth, and Penthouses Oh Wicked Wanda by Ron Embleton and Frederic Mullally. Penthouse would later put out a number of erotic comic magazines: Penthouse Comix, Penthouse Men's Adventure and Penthouse Max with the likes of Adam Hughes contributing artwork.

From 1965, Warren Publishing started publishing two black and white magazines, Creepy and Eerie, commissioning work from the artists who had worked on EC's horror line.  Warren added Vampirella in 1969, and then the science fiction magazine titled 1984 (later 1994) starting in the year 1978. The large format of these titles meant that they could be sold with other magazines aimed at adults rather than displayed in comic racks where the child-oriented titles were found.

The publishers of the American humor magazine National Lampoon discovered the French adult magazine Métal hurlant, and in 1977 started publishing Heavy Metal translating the work of Milo Manara, Caza, Vittorio Giardino, Jean-Claude Forest, Jean Giraud(a.k.a. Moebius) and Guido Crepax for an English audience. Heavy Metal also provided a forum for the work of American creators such as Richard Corben and Howard Chaykin.

In 1974, Larry Flynt came out with Hustler Magazine, which featured a strip called Honey Hooker with art originally by James McQuade and later by Tom Garst.  Starting in the early 1970s, McQuade drew a series of erotic graphic novels featuring the character Misty.

In 1983, Warren went bankrupt, but more recently, Dark Horse Comics has been reprinting some of Warren's old stories, and has revived the Creepy and Eerie magazines.

Underground comics 

Adult comics continued underground in the late 1960s outside the umbrella of the CCA. The underground comics movement was spearheaded by creators such as Art Spiegelman, Robert Crumb, Harvey Pekar, Kim Deitch and Spain Rodriguez.  Larry Welz appeared in the 1980s with his Cherry book, an underground-style erotic parody of Archie Comics. These titles were often sold at head shops, but these establishments were often at loggerheads with the police, sometimes making distribution difficult.

Independent publishers 

In 1966, Wally Wood hit upon the idea of publishing his own comic, and selling it through comic book specialty shops.  Recruiting star creators from among his friends, witzend featured one-off strips on a wide variety of themes by the likes of Jack Kirby, Steve Ditko, Frank Frazetta, Gil Kane and Art Spiegelman.

Fantagraphics Books began in 1976, publishing the Comics Journal and later Amazing Heroes with text articles about the comics field, but they began publishing actual comics in 1982, notably Love and Rockets by Gilbert and Jaime Hernandez.  In 1990, Fantagraphics established their Eros Comix imprint, reprinting titles by Wally Wood and Frank Thorne as well as Gilbert's Birdland.

Canadian Dave Sim began publishing Cerebus in 1977, and Richard and Wendy Pini put out Elfquest starting in 1978, initially through their own WaRP company.  Pacific Comics was formed in 1981, and became the first publisher of Dave Stevens's Rocketeer which was eventually made into a movie.  Stevens modeled one of the characters on Bettie Page harkening back to an earlier era of clandestine publishing.

Antarctic Press was founded in 1984, and publishes American manga and independent creators, notably Terry Moore's Strangers in Paradise.

Dark Horse Comics was founded in 1986. Its first comic book was the adult-oriented anthology, Dark Horse Presents, which published Frank Miller's noirish Sin City, later made into a feature film.

Avatar Press began providing a showcase for the works of Alan Moore and Al Rio in 1996.  Top Shelf Productions was formed in 1997, publishing Moore and Melinda Gebbie's Lost Girls erotic graphic novel.

Mainstream publishers 
The publisher of Marvel Comics in the 1960s, Martin Goodman, was also the publisher for a number of men's adventure magazines: Men, Male and Stag.  In these magazines, they included a strip called The Adventures of Pussycat drawn by Wally Wood and Bill Ward.  These strips were eventually collected, and released as a one-shot magazine in 1968.  Inside, it is listed as being printed by Marvel Comics, but there is no Marvel logo on the cover, nor any Comics Code mark.  The lack of a Comics Code mark came to be a subtle sign that one might find adult content inside.

Intrigued by Warren's success with their black and white titles, Marvel Comics tried their hand at this field as well releasing Savage Tales starting in 1971, Tomb of Dracula in 1972 and Savage Sword of Conan in 1974.  In 1974, Marvel even released three issues of Comix Book under their Curtis imprint featuring the work of underground creators.   Heavy Metals success with glossy color science fiction and fantasy didn't go unnoticed either, and in 1980, Marvel released their Epic Illustrated magazine as well as a number of adult themed graphic novels under the Epic label.  By 1986 though, they had cancelled Epic Illustrated, although Savage Sword of Conan continued running until 1995.

By the 1980s, there was a growing trend towards grim and gritty anti-heroes and increasing violence in comics.  Marvel Comics' Punisher received his own title in 1985, and in 1986, DC Comics' Watchmen by Alan Moore and The Dark Knight Returns by Frank Miller explored issues related to vigilantes.

In 1986, DC Comics started publishing comics with the words "For Mature Readers" or "Suggested for Mature Readers" on their covers.  These mature readers titles included The Shadow (1986), The Question (from #8 1987-), Slash Maraud (1987-8), Swamp Thing (from #57 1987-), Vigilante (from #44 1987-8), Wasteland (1987-), Batman: The Killing Joke (1988), Green Arrow (#1-62 1988-92), Haywire (1988-9), Hellblazer (1988-), Tailgunner Jo (1988-9), V for Vendetta (1988-), Blackhawk (1989–90), Deadman: Love After Death (1989), Gilgamesh II (1989), The Sandman (1989-), Doom Patrol (1990-), Shade the Changing Man (1990-), Twilight (1990), World Without End (1990-1), Mister E (1991), Animal Man (1992-), Deadman: Exorcism (1992) and Mighty Love (2004).

In 1993, DC started up their Vertigo imprint that allowed explicit content in selected titles, grouping a number of their mature readers titles together.  Notable Vertigo titles include the Eisner Award winners, Fables, 100 Bullets, Preacher and The Sandman as well as several books that have been adapted into feature films, Hellblazer, A History of Violence, Stardust and V for Vendetta.

In 2001, Marvel Comics withdrew from the Comics Code Authority, and set up their own content rating system, and an adult-oriented Max imprint.  In January 2011, DC announced that they were withdrawing from the Comics Code as well, and the sole remaining CCA member Archie Comics withdrew the day after, bringing the code to its end.

Erotic comics 

Some adult comics are pornographic, focusing substantially on sexual activity, either for its own sake or as a major story element. As such they are usually not permitted to be legally sold to minors. Some examples grew out of the underground comix scene, such as Cherry by Larry Welz, which parodied Archie Comics. Omaha the Cat Dancer by Kate Worley and Reed Waller combined sexually explicit material with a melodrama featuring anthropomorphic animals. XXXenophile by Phil Folgio blended science fiction and fantasy scenarios with sexual situations.

Early comics produced for gay and bisexual male readers often focused on sexual situations, such as Kake by Tom of Finland and Harry Chess by Al Shapiro. Although gay comics have expanded to cover a variety of genres, erotica has continued to be popular sometimes incorporated into other genres, such as the erotic superheroes published by Class Comics, the wordless graphic novels written by Dale Lazarov, and yaoi hentai produced in Japan.

Europe
The French comics anthology Pilote was published from 1959 to 1989, and featured the work of adult-oriented creators such as Jean Giraud (Moebius), Guido Crepax, Caza and the American Robert Crumb.  By 1974, Jean Giraud and some of his comrades had become dissatisfied with Pilote, and broke off to found the Metal Hurlant magazine to showcase adult comics in the science fiction or fantasy genres.

In France in 1962, Jean-Claude Forest started producing a strip called Barbarella, set in outer space, but where the heroine found herself losing her clothing or ending up in sexual situations.

In 1965, the Belgian artist Guy Peellaert released the first graphic novel, The Adventures of Jodelle.  In Italy, Guido Crepax starting publishing Valentina in Linus magazine. In 1966, also in Italy, the artist Sandro Angiolini put out the first issue of Isabella.  In 1968, Yves Duval and Dino Attanasio started writing/drawing a sexy strip called Candida for the Belgian magazine Cine-Revue.

In England, in 1969, writer Jo Addams and artist Luis Roca started publishing the Scarth A.D. 2195 strip in the newspaper, The Sun.  In 1972, Don Lawrence started producing a strip Carrie for Mayfair magazine.  In 1976, John Richardson started drawing the strip Amanda also for The Sun.

In 1977, the British anthology 2000 A.D. first appeared, and featured the work of many writers and artists who were to become influential in the adult comics field in the U.S. later, notably Alan Moore and Dave Gibbons who co-created Watchmen and Neil Gaiman who went on to work on The Sandman.  In 1978, artist Enrique Badia Romero and writer Donne Avenell starting producing the strip Axa for The Sun.

In 1978, the Belgian company Casterman started putting out the magazine À Suivre attracting submissions by many of the same contributors who were seen in Metal Hurlant.  Catalan Communications and more recently NBM Publishing have also published adult works from Europe mostly as standalone graphic novels, although NBM now has an anthology magazine called Sizzle.

In 1979, the British magazine Viz first appeared parodying earlier British comics anthologies with an injection of incongruous sex or violence.  In 1982, Raymond Briggs tried to give British comics a more serious tone with works such as When the Wind Blows about an older couple trying to come to terms with the aftermath of a nuclear attack.

Horacio Altuna is an Argentine artist who has done many four page strips for Playboy Magazine's Spanish, Italian and German editions.

Japanese manga

In Japan, comic books (manga) intended for adults are usually divided into 'seinen manga' (青年漫画　comics for men) and 'josei manga' (女性漫画　comics for women). Erotic comics aimed at men are referred to as 'seijin-muke manga' (成人向け漫画) or 'ero manga' and those aimed at women are called 'ladies comics' (レーディーズ・コミック) (see also the English loanword 'hentai').  Shonen manga for boys tend to outsell seinen manga which in turn outsell seijin-muke manga.

Some of the first specialized manga magazines were aimed at adult men.  Weekly Manga Times debuted in 1956, and originally focused on erotic fiction and 'porno manga'. Weekly Manga Goraku first came out in 1964, and was also aimed at the relatively older demographic of men from their 30s through to their 50s.  Manga Action and Young Comic debuted in 1967, followed by Big Comic in 1968, with Weekly Young Jump following in 1979, and Weekly Young Magazine'' in 1980.  Manga with the word 'young' in the title tend to be aimed at a younger demographic of 15-30s.

Notable artists and writers

 Horacio Altuna
 Milton Caniff
 Philippe "Zep" Chappuis
 Howard Chaykin
 Richard Corben
 Molly Crabapple
 Guido Crepax
 Robert Crumb
 Kim Deitch
 Kevin Eastman
 Will Elder
 Frank Frazetta
 Neil Gaiman
 Melinda Gebbie
 Dave Gibbons
 Jean Giraud
 Gilbert Hernandez
 Jaime Hernandez
 Adam Hughes
 Ralf Koenig
 Harvey Kurtzman
 Touko "Tom of Finland" Laaksonen
 Milo Manara
 Suehiro Maruo
 Frank Miller
 Alan Moore
 Al Rio
 Terry Moore
 Harvey Pekar
 Spain Rodriguez
 Paolo Eleuteri Serpieri
 Dave Sim
 Art Spiegelman
 Frank Thorne
 U-jin
 Alberto Vargas
 Bastien Vivès
 Bill Ward
 Larry Welz
 John Willie
 Wally Wood
 Hiroki Yagami
 Toshiki Yui

See also

 Dōjinshi
 Children's comics
 Photo comics
 :Category:Publishers of adult comics

References

External links

Comics genres